The Tripura Tribal Areas Autonomous District Council (TTAADC) is an autonomous district council administering the Tipra-dominated areas of the state of Tripura, India. Its council and assembly are situated in Khumulwng, a town 26 km away from Agartala, the state capital.

Presently, with the result of 2021 ADC election held at 6 April, TIPRA Motha has emerged as the majority with 18 seats along with its ally The Indigenous Nationalist Party of Twipra. This is the maiden win of the newly formed regional party TIPRA in the ADC election. The Chairman of TIPRA, Pradyot Bikram Manikya is to become the CEM of the newly elected Council. However, Purna Chandra Jamatia was chosen as the Chief Executive Member of the council for the first time.

In the 2005 elections to the TTAADC the Left Front won 24 seats out of the 28 elected seats and the Indigenous Nationalist Party of Twipra four. The Left Front and INPT had contested within the framework of an electoral understanding.

The term of the previous council ended on 17 May 2020 and following the postponement of elections for a result of the global COVID-19 pandemic, TTAADC is currently under Governor's rule until a new council can be elected. However, in the 2021 ADC election the Left Front has drawn blank failing to win a single seat.

The TTAADC is set to be renamed the Tipra Territorial Council (TTC), as part of a general reorganization which will also expand the council's powers and increase the number of seats on it from 28 elected and 2 appointed to 44 elected and 6 appointed.

History

The Tripura Tribal Areas Autonomous District Council (TTAADC) Act 1979 was passed by the Indian parliament after a series of democratic movements launched by the Indigenous people of Tripura, under the provision of the 6th scheduled of the Indian constitution. The principal objective behind setting up the autonomous district council is to empower the Indigenous people to govern themselves and also to bring all round developments of the backward people so as to protect and preserve their culture, customs, and traditions. But it actually came into being on 15 January 1982 and elected members were sworn in on 18 January 1982.
Later, it was upgraded under the provision of the 6th schedule of the Indian constitution by the 49th constitution (Amendment) act, 1984; with effect from 1 April 1985.

Total area
The total area of the TTAADC is 7,132.56 km2., which covers about 68% of the total area (10,491 km2) of the state.

About 70% of land under TTAADC is covered by hilly forest, whereas all the plain cultivable land including all the districts and sub-divisional headquarters are outside the purview of.

Population
The population of the TTAADC area is 12,16,465 out of which the Scheduled Tribes are 10,21,560, i.e. 83.4% of the population in the TTAADC area.

In the total population of 3,673,917 of Tripura (as per 2011 census) the total population of Scheduled Tribes is 11,66,813 (31.76%). Therefore, the number of Scheduled Tribes of the state who reside in the TTAADC area is 87.55% of the total Indigenous population of Tripura.

Executive Wing

Executive Committee
TTAADC has a regular administrative structure. The Executive committee composed of 10 members and chief executive officer (CEO) is the head of the administration. The executive powers are vested with the executive committee, which is headed by the Chief executive member (CEM), who is elected from among the Treasury Bench members.

The Sixth Schedule to the Constitution of India provides ample powers to the district council for self-Governance of the Indigenous Tipra population of the state. The district council has its own powers to appoint its own staff in terms of requirement and appointment rules. The council administration is headed by the chief executive officer and a deputy chief executive officer of TCS Grade-I and 6 executive officers, for executive departments such as administration, finance, rural development, planning, development, and coordination, etc.

The executive committee of the TTAADC was formed by notification of the CEO on 23 April 2021 by TIPRA, the winning party alliance after getting elected and installed by the Governor of the state. The list of the Executive members are as follows:

Administrative structure

Administration of TTAADC and its subordinate offices are managed from its headquarters in Khumulwng, West Tripura. Chief Executive Officer, TTAADC is responsible for day to day administrative functions who is further supported by Addl CEO, Dy CEO and a number of Principal Officers and Executive Officers. At grassroots level, there are 527 Village councils functioning as primary units as institutions of local self governance similar to Gram Panchayats in Non- ADC areas. For administrative supervision, the TTAADC has following field offices as indicated in Table below.

DEPARTMENTS
There are different departments headed by a Principal Officer as the departmental head . The departments  are:  
Agriculture, 
ARDD
Co-Operative
Education
Fisheries 
Forest, 
Health and Family Welfare, 
Industry, 
Kokborok, Indigenous Languages Research 
Land Records and Settlement, 
Law, 
S & YP 
Tribal Welfare  
Village Committee 
Public Works Department 
ICA & T
RURAL DEVELOPMENT
SW & SE
RD
SCIENCE & TECH
INDUSTRIES

Zonal Development Office
There are eight Zonal Development Offices along with 44 Sub-Zonal Development Offices for the development works of Tripura Tribal Areas Autonomous District Council areas. There are also Zonal Advisory Committee having one chairman and eight Committee Members in each zone.

Sub-Zonal Development Office
The Sub-Zonal Development Offices are as follows :

Khumulwng
BELBARI
SUMILI
DAKDU TWISA
HEZAMARA
ABHICHARAN
MANDWI
Baijalbari         
Mungiakami
TWIMADHU
BACHAIBARI
TULASIKOK
DUSKI
MOHANBHOG        
Bishramganj
PROMODH NAGAR
JAMPUIJALA
GABORDI       
B C Manu
Kaladepa
Manubankul
RATANPUR
KALSIMUKH
Dalak  
GURAKAPPA
Killa
AMPI
GARJEE
MARANDI
Gandacharra
Raisyabari
Gonganagar
Sikaribari
AMBASA
CHAWMANU
MANU
Maharani
Dumacharra    
Vangmun
DASDA
Noagang
LALJURI
Rajkandi
MACHMARA

Legislative Wing
The TTAADC is governed by a council which has 30 members. Out of 30 members, 28 members are elected through adult suffrage, while 2 members are nominated by the governor of Tripura. Out of 28 elected seats, 25 are reserved for Scheduled Tribes who are the Indigenous Tipra-people of Tripura.

The Legislative Department of the district council is headed by the chairman, who summons the meeting of the council from time to time in connection with approval of budget, discussion on bills, rules and regulations submitted by the treasury bench and passing of the same thereof.

The council consists of 30 members, out of which 28 members are elected by adult franchise and 2 members are nominated by the governor of Tripura.

The chairman has his own secretariat headed by the secretary to the district council.

Elections 

The details of various elections are as follows:

 2021 TTAADC Election
 2015 TTAADC Election
 2010 TTAADC Election

Constituencies

Judiciary Wing
Paragraph 4 and 5 of the Sixth Schedule provides for administration of justice in Autonomous areas. Under the above paragraphs, the ADCs are empowered to constitute Courts for trials of cases between parties belonging to Scheduled Tribe Communities.

General Powers

Administrative

A) The following matters are under the exclusive control and administration of the council :

Allotment, occupation, use or using apart of land other than reserved forests  ;
Management of forests not being reserved forest ;
Use of canal water & water course for agriculture ;
Jhum ;
Village Committee or council ;
Any other matter relating to administration including public health and sanitation.

B) The Council may establish or manage :

Primary schools ;
Dispensaries ;
Markets ;
Cattle pounds ;
Fisheries ;
Ferries ;
Roads ;
Road transport and waterways.

C) The Government may entrust functions relating to the following matters to the Council :

Agriculture ;
Animal Resource Development ;
Community Projects ;
Co-operative Societies ;
Social Welfare ;
Village Planning ;
Fisheries ;
Plantations ;
Any other matter to which the executive power of the state extends.

Legal

A) The council has Powers to frame  laws in the following matters with the approval of Governor :

Inheritance of property of schedule tribes ;
Marriage and divorce where any party belongs to a schedule tribes ;
Social customs of schedule tribes ;
Allotment, occupation, use or setting apart of all lands other than reserve forests ;
Management of forest other than reserve forest ;
Use of canal or water courses for purposes of agriculture ;
Jhum ;
Village Committees or Council ;
Any other matter relating to administration including public health and sanitation;

 
B) The Council may regulate and control :

Money lending ;
Trade.

C) The Council may, with previous approval of the Government make regulation for administration and control of :

Primary schools ;
Dispensaries ;
Markets ;
Cattle Pounds ;
Ferries ;
Fisheries ;
Roads ;
Road transport and waterways.

Financial

A) The Council shall get a share of :

Forest royalties ;
Royalties accruing each year from licensing or lease for the purpose of projecting for, or the extraction of  minerals granted by the state government.

B) The Council shall have the powers to levy and collect the faxes :

For maintenance of schools, dispensaries or roads ;
On entry of goods into markets and tolls on passengers and goods carried in ferries ;
On animals, vehicles and boats :
On professional trades, callings and employments.

Relationship with Panchayat
Before the establishment of the district council, villages included in its jurisdiction had Gram panchayats like the rest of the state. Following the establishment of the council, Tripura Panchayat Raj Act ceased to operate in that area and there was no village level body- elected or otherwise. In 2006, the State Government decided to hold elections to the Village Councils by treating them on par with
village Panchayats in other parts of the State taking the view that nothing in Sixth Schedule precludes such a course of action. The Autonomous Council is, however, as of 2009, yet to transfer any functions to these newly established Councils.

Rural Development Blocks within TTAADC
West Tripura district
 Lefunga
 Hezamara
 Jampuijola
 Mandwi
 Mungiakami
 Padmabil
 Tulashikhor
Bishramganj Amtali/Gulaghati

North Tripura district
 Damcherra
 Jampui Hill
 Pecharthal
 Dasda

South Tripura district
 Ompinagar
 Killa
 Karbook
 Rupaichhori

Dhalai district
 Chhawmanu
 Manu
 Dumburnagar
 Salema
 Ambassa
Ganganagar
Raisyabari
(Pecharthal RD Block was created bifurcating the Dasda RD Block on 28 November 1994. At that time this block consisted of 22 (Twenty Two) Nos. ADC Villages. On 1 April 1999, this block was again bifurcated and Damcherra RD Block was created comprising 9 (Nine) Nos. ADC Villages. Thereafter, Pecharthal RD Block consisted of 13 Nos. ADC Villages and again 1 (One) ADC Village namely Joymanipara ADC Village has been excluded from Pecharthal RD Block in recent re-organization of District and Sub-Divisions. At present, Pecharthal RD Block consists of 12 (Twelve) Nos. of ADC Villages under Kumarghat Sub-Division, Unakoti District (w.e.f. 01-01-2012 ). The Block area is mainly dominated by Chakma Tribes, other Sub-Tribes found in this Block area are Reang, Tripuri and Darlong community.)

See also
 2021 Tripura Tribal Areas Autonomous District Council election
 Kokborok
 Tripuri Dances
 Tripuri people
 North Eastern Council
 Hill tribes of Northeast India

References

External links

 Tripura Tribal Areas Autonomous District Council
 Tripura Tribal Areas Autonomous District Council on Twitter
 Tiprasa.com

 
Government of Tripura
Autonomous district councils of India
States and territories established in 1982
1982 establishments in Tripura